The Niki class of destroyers were ordered by the Royal Hellenic Navy before World War I when the Greek government embarked on a naval buildup after losing the Greco-Turkish War of 1897. These four ships were ordered from Germany in 1905 and were built in the Vulcan shipyard at Stettin.

During World War I, these ships were seized by the French Navy when Greece did not enter the war on the side of the allies, and were returned to the Hellenic Royal Navy in 1917 when Greece declared war.

External links
 Naval History

Destroyer classes